Jörg Syrlin the Younger (c.1455–1521) was a German sculptor. He was born in Ulm, the son of Jörg Syrlin the Elder and became a member of the Ulm school.

Further reading 
 Anja Schneckenburger-Broschek. "Syrlin." In Grove Art Online. Oxford Art Online, (accessed January 1, 2012; subscription required).
 
 Ludger Alscher, Günter Feist and Peter H. Feist (ed.): Lexikon der Kunst, Architektur, Bildende Kunst, Angewandte Kunst, Industriegestaltung, Kunsttheorie. Vol. IV. Das europäische Buch, Westberlin 1984, p. 777.
 Wolfgang Lipp: Begleiter durch das Ulmer Münster. Langenau 1999, .
 Eduard Mauch: "Georg Sürlin, Vater, und Georg Sürlin, Sohn, Bildner in Stein und Holz." Württembergischer Bildersaal. Vol I. Schaber, Stuttgart 1859,  (Digitalized).
 Anna Moraht-Fromm and Wolfgang Schürle (ed.): Kloster Blaubeuren. Der Chor und sein Hochaltar. (Alb und Donau, Kunst und Kultur; 31). Theiss, Stuttgart 2002, .

External links 
 

1450s births
1521 deaths
15th-century German sculptors
German male sculptors
16th-century German sculptors
People from Ulm